Left Hand Path is the debut studio album by Swedish death metal band Entombed, released on 4 June 1990 by Earache Records.

Background 
The title of the album refers to the left-hand path belief system. Guitarist Alex Hellid found the term in Anton LaVey's book The Satanic Bible.

The title track contains an interpolation of the theme from the 1979 horror film Phantasm at 3:54.

Legacy

Guitar tone
Left Hand Path is noted for defining the style of Swedish death metal by being the first studio album to feature the "buzzsaw" guitar tone that would later become a staple for the regional scene thereafter. The guitar tone was achieved using guitars tuned to B standard tuning through a Boss HM-2 Heavy Metal pedal with all the controls set to max. These guitars were panned to the left and right channels, while a third guitar using a Boss DS-1 distortion pedal was placed in the center channel along with the bass. Leif "Leffe" Cuzner has been credited as the creator of the Swedish death metal guitar tone, who was a guitarist in the band Nihilist (who later reformed as Entombed).

Accolades 
Left Hand Path was ranked No. 82 on Rolling Stone's 100 Greatest Metal Albums of All Time.

In August 2005, Decibel inducted Left Hand Path into the Decibel Magazine Hall of Fame, naming it the first "proper" Swedish death metal album, with the "buzzsaw" guitar tone being crowned as the legendary "Entombed sound".

Cover versions 
Two songs from the album were covered by Belgian death metal band Aborted: "Drowned" for the re-release of The Archaic Abattoir and "Left Hand Path" for the EP Coronary Reconstruction.

In popular media 
"Drowned" was featured in the 2009 video game Grand Theft Auto IV: The Lost and Damned on the radio station Liberty City Hardcore.

Track listing

Personnel 
Entombed
 Lars-Göran Petrov – vocals
 Uffe Cederlund – guitar, bass
 Alex Hellid – guitar
 Nicke Andersson – drums, bass

Technical personnel
 Tomas Skogsberg – production, engineering
 Dan Seagrave – cover art
 Micke Lundstrom – photography
 David Windmill – design

References 

1990 debut albums
Entombed (band) albums
Albums with cover art by Dan Seagrave
Earache Records albums